Martí Herrero (born 14 August 1964) is a Spanish freestyle skier. He competed in the men's moguls event at the 1992 Winter Olympics.

References

1964 births
Living people
Spanish male freestyle skiers
Olympic freestyle skiers of Spain
Freestyle skiers at the 1992 Winter Olympics
Sportspeople from Barcelona
20th-century Spanish people